This is a list of media based on works by American author Stephen King (including the Richard Bachman titles). Note that aside from Creepshow 2, It Chapter Two, and Doctor Sleep, the sequels are only tangentially related to King's work. King's bibliography also includes works that he has written directly for other formats such as screenplays, teleplays, comics, and audiobooks.

Films

Stephen King's filmography

Other adaptations

Television

Stephen King's television credits

Other adaptations

Derivative works

Films

Television

Print

Comic books

Stage

1988: Carrie is notorious for its history as a flop on Broadway, and has gained a cult following in recent years. The musical was revived at the Lucille Lortel Theatre in New York, directed by Stafford Arima from January until April 2012. On September 25, 2012, the first official cast recording was released. The new production is currently available to license for professional and amateur productions from Rodgers & Hammerstein Theatricals.
1990: Ghost Stories was an adaptation of Stephen King's short stories "The Return of Timmy Baterman," about zombies; "Strawberry Spring," about a campus serial killer; "Gray Matter," a black comedy about a hideous mutation caused by a bottle of beer; "Uncle Otto's Truck," and "The Boogeyman," about a distraught father's encounter with a child-killing closet monster, as well as selections from Pet Sematary. Adapted and directed by Robert Pridham, the play premiered at the Arts Center Theatre at Kent Place School in Summit, New Jersey, and toured the United States in the mid-1990s.
1993: Rage stage play written by Phillip Smith, produced by Shane Black, and directed by Jim Birge. It was intended to premiere in Jasper, Indiana, but scheduling and venue issues due to protests over its mature themes forced it to move to the American Legion hall in Santa Claus, Indiana, where it ran from April 23 to May 1.
2005: Misery stage play by Simon Moore based on 1987 novel. Another adaptation, written by William Goldman (who wrote the 1990 film), premiered on Broadway in 2015 with Bruce Willis and Laurie Metcalf. This version was also adapted to Polish language. It premiered at the Kwadrat Theatre in Warsaw in 2017. A musical version also exists, written by Jeff Hockhauser and Bob Johnson. While it has not been staged, a demo recording has circulated on the internet in recent years.
2009: Rita Hayworth and Shawshank Redemption was dramatized by Dave Johns and Owen O'Neill for the Gaiety Theatre, Dublin. A later version, directed by Peter Sheridan, had its world premiere at the Peter Sheridan Theatre in London in September 2010. A production was mounted at the Edinburgh Festival Fringe directed by Lucy Pitman-Wallace in August 2013. In April 2019, The Shawshank Redemption made its North American debut at the Metropolitan Ensemble Theatre in Kansas City, Missouri, directed by Bob Paisley. It garnered great reviews from critics during its run. It featured Keenan Ramos as Red, Chris Roady as Andy Defresne, S.E. Perry as Warden Stammas, Tim Ahlenius as Hadley, Chad Burris as Boggs Diamond, Dan Daly as Pinky, Kevin Fewell as Brooksie, Christopher Preyer as Rooster, Larry Goodman as Dawkins, Nick Hazel as Entwhistle, Evan Lovelace as Tommy, Andrew Paredes as Rico, and Alex Paxton as inmate/guard.
2012: Ghost Brothers of Darkland County, an original musical with book by Stephen King and music and lyrics by John Mellencamp. After a week of previews, it ran at Atlanta's Alliance Theatre from April 11 to May 13, 2012. A concept album was released the following year.
2013: Dolores Claiborne is an American opera composed by Tobias Picker. It premiered at the San Francisco Opera in Fall 2013.
2014: The Body (also known as "Stand By Me") was produced by Chellaston Players in Derby, England. Though an amateur staging (produced with Stephen King's permission), it received rave reviews.

There have also been dramatizations of many of King's short stories, including "Nona", "Quitters, Inc.", "In the Deathroom", "Strawberry Spring", "Harvey's Dream", "The Man Who Loved Flowers", "Mute", "The Ten O'Clock People" and King's poem, "Paranoid: A Chant". There have also been alleged stage productions of Rage as well as several parody stage versions of The Shining.

Music
1983: "The Stand", recorded and released by Welsh rock band The Alarm, was recorded and released in the United Kingdom as a single. The song's lyrics were inspired by King's novel of the same name.
1985: "Lone Justice", recorded and released by American heavy metal band Anthrax, was based on the King novella The Gunslinger.
1984: "Horror-Teria: (The Beginning)" from the Twisted Sister album Stay Hungry. The album's liner notes thank King for inspiring the piece.
1987: "Among the Living", recorded and released by American heavy metal band Anthrax, was based on the King novel The Stand. "The Walkin' Dude" is Randall Flagg, the main villain in the novel, and the beginning verse: "Disease! Disease! Spreading the disease!\With some help from Captain Trips\He'll bring the world down to its knees" refers to the virus that destroys most of the population in the novel.
1987: "A Skeleton in the Closet", recorded and released by American heavy metal band Anthrax, was based on the King novella Apt Pupil from the collection Different Seasons.
1987: "Severed Survival", recorded and released by American death metal band Autopsy, was based on the King short story Survivor Type.
1988: "Misery Loves Company", recorded and released by American heavy metal band Anthrax, was based on the King novel Misery.
1988: Formation of the American punk rock band Pennywise who took the name from the evil clown monster of the same name from King's highly successful epic horror novel It.
1989: "Pet Sematary", recorded and released by American punk rock band The Ramones, was a single from their eleventh studio album Brain Drain. The song was originally written for the King movie adaptation of the same name of the novel. The single became one of the band's biggest radio hits and a staple in their concerts during the 1990s.
2000: The music video for the song "Spit it Out", recorded and released by American heavy metal band Slipknot, pays homage to Stanley Kubrick's 1980 film adaptation of the King novel The Shining.
2002: Formation of the Dutch symphonic metal band Delain who took the name from the Kingdom of Delain from the King novel The Eyes of the Dragon.
2006: The music video for the song The Kill, recorded and released by American rock band Thirty Seconds to Mars, was inspired by Stanley Kubrick's 1980 film adaptation of the King novel The Shining.
2006: The song "Carry the Blessed Home", recorded and released by German power metal band Blind Guardian on their eighth studio album A Twist in the Myth. It is about Roland Deschain and Jake Chambers at the end of The Dark Tower series.
2007: "Dull Boy", recorded and released by American heavy metal band Mudvayne, was a single for both the band's fourth studio album The New Game and the band's compilation album By the People, for the People. The "Dull Boy" song was based on both the King novel and the Stanley Kubrick movie of The Shining.
2010: King provided the voice of Will 'o the Wisp for Shooter Jennings's "Black Ribbons" music video.
2014: The music video for the song "Animals", recorded and released by American pop rock band Maroon 5, was inspired by a blood drop scene from the 1976 film adaptation of the King novel Carrie.
2015: American heavy metal and metallic hardcore band Ice Nine Kills recorded and released the song "Hell in the Hallways" (which was based on King's first horror novel Carrie) on their fourth studio album Every Trick in the Book. A number of months later, the band created, recorded and released the single "Enjoy Your Slay" (based on Stanley Kubrick's 1980 film adaptation of the King novel The Shining) from their fifth studio album The Silver Scream.
2016: The song "Breathing Lightning", recorded and released by American heavy metal band Anthrax, was based on The Dark Tower series.
2016: Boston, Massachessets-formed and based musical band Walter Sickert & the Army of Broken Toys included a song, titled "Dull Boy", on their 2016 album Come Black Magic with lyrics inspired by The Shining. The song is otherwise unrelated to the Mudvayne track listed above.
2019: American heavy metal and metallic hardcore band Ice Nine Kills recorded and released their fifth studio album The Silver Scream, featuring their song "It is the End" which is based upon and inspired by the 2017 theatrical film adaptation of King's highly successful epic horror novel It.

See also
 Dollar Babies, short film adaptations of King material made by students and aspiring filmmakers
 Stephen King bibliography

References

External links
 

 
Lists of television series based on works
Lists of films based on works